Rhona Natasha Mitra (born August 9, 1976) is a British actress, model and singer.

Mitra is known for her roles as Sonja in Underworld: Rise of the Lycans (2009); as Major Rachel Dalton on the second and third seasons of Strike Back (2012–2013); as Rachel Scott in the first two seasons of The Last Ship (2014–2015); Holly Marie Begins on the sixth season of Party of Five (1999–2000); as Kate Hedges in Ali G Indahouse (2002); as Tara Wilson on the final season of The Practice (2003–2004) and the first and second seasons of Boston Legal (2004–2005); as Detective Kit McGraw on the third season of Nip/Tuck (2005); in the lead role of the science fiction/action film Doomsday as Major Eden Sinclair (2008); as an assassin in the Netflix film Game Over, Man! (2018); and as Mercy Graves in the CW series Supergirl (2018).

Early life
Her father is of Bengali Indian descent, while her mother is Irish.

Career

Mitra appeared as the live-action model for Lara Croft, the lead character in Eidos Interactive's Tomb Raider video game series before Angelina Jolie took the role for the two Tomb Raider films (2001–2003). Mitra was ranked No. 46 on the Maxim Hot 100 Women of 2001. She played the romantic interest of Christopher Lambert in Beowulf. Her first main role came as Scott Wolf's illicit love interest on Party of Five. In 2000, Mitra had a small role in the film Hollow Man as a neighbour who is raped by Kevin Bacon's character. She had a main role in the medical drama Gideon's Crossing, as Alejandra "Ollie" Klein. Mitra then had roles in Ali G Indahouse, Sweet Home Alabama, Stuck on You, and leading roles in Highwaymen and Spartacus. Mitra appeared in the final season of The Practice as Tara Wilson, and continued that role into its spin-off Boston Legal, but left not long into the second season. In 2005, Mitra played the role of Kit McGraw during season 3 of Nip/Tuck. Mitra then went on to appear in Skinwalkers, The Number 23 and Shooter.

In 2008, Mitra starred in the lead role of the science fiction/action film Doomsday as Major Eden Sinclair (sometimes mistakenly named in some databases as being Caryn Peterson), and in 2009 went on to star in Underworld: Rise of the Lycans as Sonja, the daughter of the powerful vampire elder Viktor (played by Bill Nighy). While filming, she grew fond of her vampire fangs, even declining to remove them when they couldn't be seen. "I put those fangs on the first day and I felt they should always have been there; it's strange. So I kept them in through the entire time of shooting, throughout all my dialogue and everything." She also appeared in three episodes of Stargate Universe.

She stars in the 2010 Anders Anderson thriller film Stolen, alongside Josh Lucas, Jon Hamm and James Van Der Beek. She portrayed Claire Radcliff in the 2010 ABC supernatural series The Gates. She played Major Rachel Dalton on Cinemax's series Strike Back: Project  Vengeance, replacing Amanda Mealing.

In 2014 and 2015, she played Rachel Scott in the first two seasons of Michael Bay's post-apocalyptic television series, The Last Ship.

In 2017, she played Charlotte in the fourth season of The Strain. 

In 2018, Mitra was cast as Mercy Graves in the CW television series Supergirl.

In 2020, Mitra starred in the science fiction film Archive as Simone. She also starred in the science fiction film Skylines as Dr Mal.

In 2022, she joined the film Hounds of War, alongside Frank Grillo, and historical film Prisoners of Paradise.
She also stars in the lead role in science-fiction film The Experiment, alongside Famke Janssen and Stefanie Martini, where she plays Captain Ava Stone.

Since 2017, Rhona lives in Uruguay, where she rescue animals on her 400 acres farms.

Nominations
Rhona Mitra was nominated in 2009 for Scream Awards for Best Actress for Underworld: Rise of the Lycans.

Filmography

Film

Television

Video games

Discography
Studio albums
 Come Alive (1998, produced by Dave Stewart)
 Female Icon (1999, produced by Dave Stewart)

Singles
 "Getting Naked" (1997)

References

External links

 

Living people
Actresses from London
British actresses of Indian descent
English female models
English film actresses
English people of Bengali descent
English people of Irish descent
English television actresses
People educated at Roedean School, East Sussex
People from Paddington
20th-century English actresses
21st-century English actresses
20th-century English women singers
20th-century English singers
21st-century English women singers
21st-century English singers
1970s births
Year of birth missing (living people)